= Kangkong, Kedah =

Town in Kedah, Malaysia

Kangkong is a town in Kedah, Malaysia.
